Flindersia australis, commonly known as crow's ash, flindosy or Australian teak,  is a species of tree that is endemic to north-eastern Australia. It has pinnate leaves with between five and thirteen egg-shaped to elliptical leaflets, white to cream-coloured flowers arranged in panicles on the ends of branchlets and followed by woody capsules studded with short, rough points and containing winged seeds.

Description
The leaves are usually arranged alternately and are crowded near the ends of the branchlets.

Taxonomy
The genus Flindersia and F. australis were first formally described in 1814 by Robert Brown in Matthew Flinders' sea voyage journal A Voyage to Terra Australis, from specimens collected near Broad Sound in September 1802.

Distribution and habitat
Crow's ash grows in rainforest and dry scrub from near Airlie Beach, inland as far as Carnarvon National Park and south to near Kempsey in New South Wales.

Conservation status
Flindersia australis is classified as of "least concern" under the Queensland Government Nature Conservation Act 1992.

References

australis
Flora of New South Wales
Flora of Queensland
Sapindales of Australia
Trees of Australia
Taxa named by Robert Brown (botanist, born 1773)
Plants described in 1814